Cureall is an unincorporated community in Howell County, in the U.S. state of Missouri.

History
A post office called Cureall was established in 1860, and remained in operation until 1958. The community was so named on account of a nearby mineral spring which was believed to hold medicinal qualities.

References

Unincorporated communities in Howell County, Missouri
Unincorporated communities in Missouri